Mount Brown is a mountain in the Canadian Rockies, located to the west of the Athabasca Pass. It was first ascended by a Euro-American in 1827 by the naturalist David Douglas, who then wrote that its "height does not seem to be less than 16,000 or 17,000 feet above the level of the sea". This over-estimation of the altitude was widely accepted at the time leading to the false notion that it and the nearby Mount Hooker were the highest peaks in the Rocky Mountains (see Hooker and Brown). Douglas named the peak for Robert Brown, the first keeper at the British Museum's botanical gardens. 

The southern branch of the Fraser River originates near this mountain.

References

External links
 
 

Two-thousanders of British Columbia
Canadian Rockies